The men's 100 metres T11 event at the 2020 Summer Paralympics in Tokyo, took place between 1 and 2 September 2021.

Records
Prior to the competition, the existing records were as follows:

Results

Heats
Heat 1 took place on 1 September 2021, at 9:42:

Heat 2 took place on 1 September 2021, at 9:50:

Heat 3 took place on 1 September 2021, at 9:58:

Heat 4 took place on 1 September 2021, at 10:06:

Semi-finals
Semi-final 1 took place on 1 September 2021, at 21:12:

Semi-final 2 took place on 1 September 2021, at 21:21:

Final
The final took place on 2 September 2021, at 19:10:

References

Men's 100 metres T11
2021 in men's athletics